Khammam revenue division (or Khammam division) is an administrative division in the Khammam district of the Indian state of Telangana. It is one of the 2 revenue divisions in the district which consists of 14 mandals under its administration. Khammam is the divisional headquarters of the division.

History 
The revenue division got modified on 11 October 2011, based on the re-organisation of the districts in the state.

Administration 
The present Revenue Divisional Officer (RDO) is Talluri Purnachandra. The mandals in the division are:

See also 
List of revenue divisions in Telangana
List of mandals in Telangana

References 

Revenue divisions in Khammam district